Frederick Emil Ahlert (September 19, 1892 – October 20, 1953) was an American composer and songwriter.

Early life 
He received a degree from Fordham Law School, but instead of pursuing a legal career he began work as an arranger, initially for Irving Aaronson and his Commanders and then for composer and band-leader Fred Waring. Ahlert had his first hit song in 1920, and eventually started his own publishing company in 1928.

Career 
His songs have been recorded by numerous artists, including Louis Armstrong, Nat King Cole, Ella Fitzgerald, Thelonious Monk, Frank Sinatra, Moon Mullican, Dean Martin, Jerry Lee Lewis, and Fats Waller. Ahlert most frequently collaborated with lyricist Roy Turk, but he also wrote with others including Joe Young and Edgar Leslie.

Ahlert was inducted into the Songwriters Hall of Fame in 1970.

Ahlert was born in, and died in, New York City, where he lived all his life.

Selected works 
Among his compositions (with Roy Turk unless otherwise noted):
 "I Don't Know Why (I Just Do)"
 "I Wake Up Smiling" (with Edgar Leslie)
 "I'll Follow You"
 "I'll Get By (as Long as I Have You)"
 "I'm Gonna Sit Right Down and Write Myself a Letter" (with Joe Young)
 "Life is a Song" (with Joe Young)
 "Love, You Funny Thing!"
 "Mean to Me"
 "The Moon Was Yellow" (with Edgar Leslie)
 "Take My Heart" (with Joe Young)
 "Walkin' My Baby Back Home"
 "Where Do You Keep Your Heart?" (with Al Stillman)
 "Where the Blue of the Night (Meets the Gold of the Day)"

Family 
Fred Ahlert and his wife, Mildred ("Millie") (c. 1894 Russia – 1955 New York City), had three sons:

 Frederick Emil Ahlert, Jr. (16 February 1926, New York City; – 8 September 2005, San Francisco) was one of the last independent music publishers. He worked for the Leo Feist Agency until he started Fred Ahlert Music Group after the death of his father in 1953. In addition to his father's catalog, among the songwriters Fred Jr. represented were Ted Koehler, Irving Kahal, Walter Donaldson, Mort Dixon, Joe Burke, Edgar Leslie, John Jacob Loeb, Harold Stanley, Burt Bacharach and Hal David.  Fred Jr. had a son, Fred Emil Ahlert III (17 May 1958 – 21 April 2008).
 Arnold Ahlert
 Richard Ahlert (4 September 1921 – 9 August 1985 Scarsdale, New York) graduated from Juilliard when he was 17.  He was a clarinetist and songwriter who composed over 1,000 songs, including the Broadway musical, Adam, for which his wife, June Tansey, wrote the book. He was a member of ASCAP and his songs included My Days of Loving You, recorded by Perry Como, and Running Out of Fools, recorded by Aretha Franklin.

Fred Ahlert had a brief prior marriage to Minnie Campbell.  They were married October 17, 1912, in Manhattan, New York.

References
General references
 Biography Index. A cumulative index to biographical material in books and magazines. Volume 14: September, 1984-August, 1986. New York: H.W. Wilson Co., 1986
 Biography Index. A cumulative index to biographical material in books and magazines. Volume 15: September, 1986-August, 1988. New York: H.W. Wilson Co., 1988
 Biography Index. A cumulative index to biographical material in books and magazines. Volume 16: September, 1988-August, 1990. New York: H.W. Wilson Co., 1990
 The New American Dictionary of Music. By Philip D. Morehead with Anne MacNeil. New York: Dutton, 1991
 American Popular Songs. From the Revolutionary War to the present. Edited by David Ewen. New York: Random House, 1966
 American Songwriters. By David Ewen. New York: H.W. Wilson Co., 1987 Biography contains portrait.
 The ASCAP Biographical Dictionary. Third edition. New York: American Society of Composers, Authors and Publishers, 1966
 ASCAP Biographical Dictionary. Fourth edition. Compiled for the American Society of Composers, Authors and Publishers by Jaques Cattell Press. New York: R.R. Bowker, 1980
 Biographical Dictionary of American Music. By Charles Eugene Claghorn. West Nyack, NY: Parker Publishing Co., 1973
 Biography Index. A cumulative index to biographical material in books and magazines. Volume 1: January, 1946-July, 1949. New York: H.W. Wilson Co., 1949
 Biography Index. A cumulative index to biographical material in books and magazines. Volume 3: September, 1952-August, 1955. New York: H.W. Wilson Co., 1956
 Biography Index. A cumulative index to biographical material in books and magazines. Volume 6: September, 1961-August, 1964. New York: H.W. Wilson Co., 1965
 The Complete Encyclopedia of Popular Music and Jazz, 1900–1950. Three volumes. By Roger D. Kinkle. New Rochelle, NY: Arlington House Publishers, 1974. Biographies are located in Volumes 2 and 3
 The Encyclopedia of Popular Music. Third edition. Eight volumes. Edited by Colin Larkin. London: MUZE, 1998. Grove's Dictionaries, New York, 1998
 Notable Names in the American Theatre. Clifton, NJ: James T. White & Co., 1976
 The Oxford Companion to Popular Music. By Peter Gammond. Oxford, England: Oxford University Press, 1991
 The Penguin Encyclopedia of Popular Music. Edited by Donald Clarke. New York: Viking Press, 1989
 Popular American Composers. From Revolutionary times to the present. A biographical and critical guide. First edition. Compiled and edited by David Ewen. New York: H.W. Wilson Co., 1962 Biography contains portrait.
 Songwriters. A biographical dictionary with discographies. By Nigel Harrison. Jefferson, NC: McFarland & Co., 1998
 Sweet and Lowdown. America's popular songwriters. By Warren Craig. Metuchen, NJ: Scarecrow Press, 1978. Biographies appear in the 'After Tin Pan Alley' section, beginning on page 91
 Tin Pan Alley. An encyclopedia of the golden age of American song. By David A. Jasen. New York: Routledge, 2003
 Obituaries on File. Two volumes. Compiled by Felice Levy. New York: Facts on File, 1979

Inline citations

External links 

 Fred Ahlert recordings at the Discography of American Historical Recordings.

1892 births
1953 deaths
Jewish American songwriters
Jewish American composers
Musicians from New York (state)
Songwriters from New York (state)
Townsend Harris High School alumni
20th-century American composers
20th-century American male musicians
20th-century American Jews